Breaking Hearts Tour was the North American leg of the Elton John Breaking Hearts Tour. The European leg was dubbed "European Express". The tour started on 17 August 1984, at Tempe, Arizona. It included five sold-out concerts in New York City performed at Madison Square Garden.

Tour
The North American leg of the Breaking Hearts Tour began on 17 August 1984, at the ASU Activity Center in Tempe and ended 62 shows later at the USF Sun Dome in Tampa. The set list began with Tiny Dancer and included songs from Elton's latest album, including "Li’l Frigerator", "Restless", "Sad Songs (Say So Much)" and, occasionally, "Who Wears These Shoes".

One night in Madison Square Garden, Elton failed to stand up and was administered oxygen for half a minute; he went on with the show. "Bennie and the Jets", as usual, had snippets of "In The Mood", "Baby, You're a Rich Man", "Chattanooga Choo Choo" and "Charlie Brown Theme Song"; "Rocket Man", for its part, had "Close Encounters Theme" as a snippet by Davey Johnstone.

Setlist
"Tiny Dancer"
"Levon"
"Lil 'Frigerator"
"Rocket Man"
"Daniel"
"Restless"
"Candle in the Wind"
"The Bitch Is Back"
"Don't Let the Sun Go Down On Me"
"Who Wears These Shoes" (added by 13 September in Toronto)
"Sad Songs (Say So Much)"
"Bennie and the Jets"
"Sorry Seems to be the Hardest Word" (Switched places with "Bennie and the Jets" starting by 28 September in Houston)
"Philadelphia Freedom"
"Blue Eyes"
"I Guess That's Why They Call It the Blues"
"Kiss the Bride"
"One More Arrow" (Dropped from the setlist after 5 November in Worcester)
"Too Low for Zero" (Dropped from the setlist after 29 September in Dallas)
"I'm Still Standing"
"Your Song"
"Saturday Night's Alright for Fighting"

Encores:
"Goodbye Yellow Brick Road"
"Crocodile Rock"
"Medley (incl. "Whole Lotta Shakin' Going On", "I Saw Her Standing There", "Twist and Shout")" (played on 29 September in Dallas only)

Tour dates

Tour band
Elton John – piano, lead vocals
Davey Johnstone – guitars, backing vocals
Dee Murray – bass guitar, backing vocals
Nigel Olsson – drums, percussion, backing vocals
Fred Mandel – keyboards, additional guitar, backing vocals

References

External links

 Information Site with Tour Dates

Elton John concert tours
1984 concert tours